Trond Jøran Pedersen (born 19 June 1958) is a Norwegian former ski jumper. He coached the Norwegian national team, including at the 1994 Winter Olympics.

References

External links

1958 births
Living people
People from Rana, Norway
Norwegian male ski jumpers
Norwegian ski jumping coaches
Norwegian Olympic coaches
Sportspeople from Nordland